"Music" is a 2001 hit single by Erick Sermon featuring archived vocals from Marvin Gaye.

The song was thought of by Sermon after buying a copy of Gaye's Midnight Love and the Sexual Healing Sessions album, which overlook some of the original album's earlier mixes. After listening to an outtake of Gaye's 1982 album track, "Turn On Some Music" (titled "I've Got My Music" in its initial version), Sermon decided to mix the vocals (done in a cappella) and add it into his own song. The result was similar to Natalie Cole's interpolation of her father, jazz great Nat "King" Cole's hit, "Unforgettable" revisioned as a duet. The hip hop and soul duet featuring the two veteran performers was released as the leading song of the soundtrack to the Martin Lawrence & Danny DeVito comedy, "What's the Worst That Could Happen?" The song became a runaway success rising to #2 on Billboard's R&B chart and was #1 on the rap charts. It also registered at #21 pop giving Sermon his highest-charted single on the pop charts as a solo artist and giving Gaye his first posthumous hit in 10 years following 1991's R&B-charted single, "My Last Chance" also bringing Gaye his 41st and last top 40 pop hit. There is also a version that's played on Adult R&B stations that removes Erick Sermon's rap verses. The song was featured in the 2011 Matthew McConaughey film The Lincoln Lawyer.

Charts

Weekly charts

Year-End charts

References

2000 songs
2001 singles
Erick Sermon songs
Marvin Gaye songs
J Records singles
Songs written by Marvin Gaye
Music